Amaresh Misra is an Indian writer and a conspiracy theorist. He was the convener of the Anti Communal Front in Uttar Pradesh state for Indian National Congress for 4 years till 2014.

During his college years, Misra was a student leader of the Left CPI-ML (Liberation) party in Allahabad University. He co-wrote the script for the movie Bullet Raja.

He has started the movement to restore Indias pride in Freedom Fighters contributions to Indias journey to independence 
https://www.dailyo.in/politics/mangal-pandey-uttar-pradesh-1857-rashtravadi-manch-amaresh-misra-hindutva-yogi-adityanath-25084

Conspiracy theories
Amaresh Misra is a proponent of several conspiracy theories. He has claimed that the 2008 Mumbai attacks were organized jointly by the CIA, Mossad and RSS. According to him, the Intelligence Bureau was behind the killing of the Mumbai Police's Anti-Terrorist Squad chief Hemant Karkare. 

He wanted to rewrite modern Indian History to reflect Indian perspective instead of the British accounts.

He unsuccessfully contested the 2009 Loksabha elections from Lucknow on the ticket of Ulema Council. He joined CONGRESS party for 5 years afer that. 
Today, he runs a peasant based Kisan Kranti Dal and Mangal Pandey Sena based in Uttar Pradesh
His youtube channel https://youtube.com/channel/UCsWBBYLod-N9tJ9cdy7y4QA has more theories

Awards

The Urdu Press Club of India awarded Amaresh with the Jasarat Award in 2007.

Aligarh Group with renowned historian Irfan Habib awarded him for historical work in 2022

Publications

Lucknow: Fire of Grace: The Story of its Renaissance, Revolution and the Aftermath (Delhi: Harper Collins, 1999) 
The Minister’s Wife (a novel—Penguin, 2002) 
Mangal Pandey: The True Story of an Indian Revolutionary (Delhi: Rupa, 2005)
War of Civilizations: India AD 1857, Vols 1 and 2 (Delhi: Rupa, 2007)

References

Living people
Indian National Congress politicians
Year of birth missing (living people)
Indian conspiracy theorists
Uttar Pradesh politicians
University of Allahabad alumni
20th-century Indian historians